The First Baptist Church  in Murray, Kentucky is a historic Southern Baptist church at 203 S. Fourth Street.  It was built in 1931-33 and added to the National Register of Historic Places in 1986.

It is a large brick church with a 1600-seat auditorium.  Orange and blue glazed brick was used in decorating its exterior.

The first church of the congregation was a frame church built in 1848 at cost of $440.  Its second church was built in 1901 at cost of $5,500. The present church cost $130,000.

References

See also
National Register of Historic Places listings in Kentucky

Baptist churches in Kentucky
Churches on the National Register of Historic Places in Kentucky
Churches completed in 1933
20th-century Baptist churches in the United States
National Register of Historic Places in Calloway County, Kentucky
1933 establishments in Kentucky
Southern Baptist Convention churches
Murray, Kentucky